Bartošovce is a village and municipality in Bardejov District in the Prešov Region of north-east Slovakia.

History
In historical records the village was first mentioned in 1427.

History from Slovak Language Bartosovce Wikipedia Page (The first written mention of the village dates back to 1408 . Because of the fertile soil and the proximity of Bardejov , landowners settled here, who built a majer with cattle breeding and cultivation of agricultural crops and flour production. There were two mills here - the upper one and the lower one. This is also why the village is still divided into Vyšný mlyn, Nižný mlyn and Podstavinec . Bartošovce have a rich history. They transformed themselves through many names, such as Bartosfaula - up to the present. Shortly after the establishment of the village, a paper mill was established here. In the 17th century , a tile factory was established here together with a brick factory, famous in the wide area of ​​eastern Austria-Hungary. Together with the village of Kurima formed the main centers of the Bardejov district until the 19th century.

Around the year 1600 , a Roman Catholic church was built here , which has been preserved here in the same form after many reconstructions (the last one in 2010) and is admired by many tourists. Two streams flow through the village - Sekčov and Vieska.)

For history prior to this time, the Principality of Halych existed in (modern) southern Poland with a western Provincial city of Przemyśl, located just north of mountains near Bartosovce.  The history of the Halych Principality Principality of Haluych history ends at the Dmitriy Liubart 1340–1349	when Lithuanian authority begins and Halych authority ends.  Slave trade and other local information may be available from a non-western European (non-Hungarian)perspective by further investigation, along this line. See M Laser History on Halych Principality (Slave Trade) circa 13th century.

As a frontier region the valley containing Bartosovce, the Sekcov River valley had some strategic importance to the Hapsburgs and Polish-Lithuanians.  The existence and history of the Kapusany castle (https://medievalheritage.eu/en/main-page/heritage/slovakia/kapusany-castle/) tells the story of the conditions and allegiances the people that the people of Bartosovce may have experienced.

Geography
The municipality lies at an altitude of 355 metres and covers an area of 11.232 km2.
It has a population of about 720 people.

Ethnicity
The village is about 99% Slovak.

Present
The village has a public library a gym  and a football pitch.

Present Information from Slovak Language Bartosovce Wikipedia Page (Currently, the village is industrial and agricultural. There is also an agricultural cooperative focused on cattle breeding. In the center of Bartošovice there is a newly reconstructed cultural center and a local shop and restaurant. The women's choir, the Plamienok children's choir take care of cultural activities, and in 2010, the Bartošovské dzivčata i paropci youth folklore ensemble was founded here . There is also a football field in the village, where the football club TJ Čergov Bartošovce plays matches.)

Genealogical resources

The records for genealogical research are available at the state archive "Statny Archiv in Presov, Slovakia"

 Roman Catholic church records (births/marriages/deaths): 1856-1897 (parish B)
 Greek Catholic church records (births/marriages/deaths): 1800-1895 (parish B)

See also
 List of municipalities and towns in Slovakia 
 Slovak Language author version of Bartosovce Wikipedia page https://sk.wikipedia.org/wiki/Barto%C5%A1ovce with better descriptions/information

References 

Registers of renewed land registration [online]. Bratislava: ÚGKK SR, [cit. 2011-12-31]. Available online.
Number of inhabitants by sex - municipality (annually) [online]. Bratislava: Statistical Office of the Slovak Republic, rev. 2022-03-31, [cit. 2022-04-01]. Available online.
Elections to municipal self-government bodies 2022: List of elected mayors [online]. Bratislava: Statistical Office of the Slovak Republic, 2022-10-30. Available online.
Overview of SR municipalities that have approved and registered coats of arms in the SR Heraldic Register as of July 1, 2006 [DOC online] ( 937 kB ).
Official website of the village of Bartošovce: "History: Coat of Arms".

External links
 
 
https://web.archive.org/web/20070427022352/http://www.statistics.sk/mosmis/eng/run.html
https://web.archive.org/web/20120420013722/http://www.saris.eu.sk/bartosovce/en
Surnames of living people in Bartosovce

Villages and municipalities in Bardejov District
Šariš